Kleedehn is a surname. Notable people with the surname include:
Bärbel Kleedehn (1952-2022), German politician
William Kleedehn, dog-sledder, competitor from 1999 to 2009 in Yukon Quest

German-language surnames